WKCM (1160 AM) is an American radio station licensed to serve the community of Hawesville, Kentucky. The station is owned and operated by Hancock Communications, Inc., doing business as the Cromwell Radio Group, and the station's broadcast license is held by Hancock Communications, Inc.

WKCM broadcasts a Classic country music format to the greater Owensboro, Kentucky, area.

History
The station signed on the air on November 7, 1972, the day of that year's election. For its first ten years on the air, it broadcast at AM 1140 on the dial. It reallocated to its present-day frequency of 1160 kilohertz in 1982.

The station's transmission tower collapsed during a windstorm in January 1976; it returned to the air the next day with a makeshift antenna.

In the 2010s, WKCM also broadcasts on three FM translators: Hawesville, KY (92.1 MHz) and Whitesville, KY (97.9 MHz). Additionally, on August 1, 2018, WKCM began simulcasting with sister station WBIO, in addition to dropping the Nash Icon syndicated format from Westwood One, and broadcasting all music and programming locally.

Former Logo

References

External links

KCM
Country radio stations in the United States